Little Heart's Ease is Royal City's third album.

Track listing
 "Bring My Father a Gift" – 3:02
 "Jerusalem" – 3:48
 "She Will Come" – 2:37
 "Count the Days" – 3:36
 "Can't You" – 4:09
 "Cabbage Rolls" – 2:53
 "My Body Is Numbered" – 5:10
 "O Beauty" - 3:45
 "Ain't That the Way" – 2:53
 "That My Head Were a Spring of Water" – 2:12
 "Enemy" – 5:32
 "Take Me Down to Yonder River" – 4:18

References

2004 albums
Royal City (band) albums
Rough Trade Records albums
Three Gut Records albums